The land speed record (or absolute land speed record) is the highest speed achieved by a person using a vehicle on land. There is no single body for validation and regulation; in practice the Category C ("Special Vehicles") flying start regulations are used, officiated by regional or national organizations under the auspices of the Fédération Internationale de l'Automobile (FIA). The land speed record (LSR) is standardized as the speed over a course of fixed length, averaged over two runs (commonly called "passes"). Two runs are required in opposite directions within one hour, and a new record mark must exceed the previous one by at least one percent to be validated.

History 

The first regulator was the Automobile Club de France, which proclaimed itself arbiter of the record in about 1902.

Until 1903, trains held the land speed record for fastest vehicles in which people could travel.

Different clubs had different standards and did not always recognize the same world records until 1924, when the Association Internationale des Automobile Clubs Reconnus (AIACR) introduced new regulations: two passes in opposite directions (to negate the effects of wind) averaged with a maximum of 30 minutes (later more) between runs, average gradient of the racing surface not more than 1 percent, timing gear accurate within 0.01sec, and cars must be wheel-driven. National or regional auto clubs (such as AAA and SCTA) had to be AIACR members to ensure records would be recognized. The AIACR became the FIA in 1947. Controversy arose in 1963: Spirit of America was not recognized due to its being a three-wheeler (leading the Fédération Internationale de Motocyclisme to certify it as a three-wheel motorcycle record when the FIA refused) and not wheel-driven so the FIA introduced a special jet and rocket propelled class. No holder of the absolute record since has been wheel-driven.

In the U.S. and Australia, record runs are often done on salt flats, so the cars are often called salt cars.

Women's land speed record 

The FIA does not recognize separate men's and women's land speed records; however, unofficial women's records have long been claimed, seemingly starting with Dorothy Levitt's 1906 record in Blackpool, England, and, unlike the FIA and other car-racing organisations, Guinness World Records does recognize gender-based land speed records.

She drove a six-cylinder Napier motorcar, a  development of the K5, in a speed trial in Blackpool.

Five weeks later, Goodyear hit back against Firestone with Lee Breedlove. While recordkeeping has not been as extensive, a report in 1974 confirmed that a record was held by Lee Breedlove, the wife of then overall record holder Craig Breedlove, who piloted her husband's Spirit of America – Sonic I to a record  in 1965. According to author Rachel Kushner, Craig Breedlove had talked Lee into taking the car out for a record attempt in order to monopolize the salt flats for the day and block one of his competitors from making a record attempt.

In 1976, the women's absolute record was set by Kitty O'Neil, in the jet-powered, three-wheeled SMI Motivator, at the Alvord Desert. Held back by her contract with a sponsor and using only 60 percent of her car's power, O'Neil reached .

Combs continued with the North American Eagle Project, whose ongoing target is the overall land speed record; as part of that effort, Combs was killed, on August 27, 2019, during an attempt to raise the four-wheel record.

Records

1898–1964 (wheel-driven)

1963–present (jet and rocket propulsion) 
The vehicle breached the FIA regulations on two grounds: it had only three wheels, and it was not wheel-driven, since its jet engine did not supply power to its axles. Some time later, the Fédération Internationale de Motocyclisme created a non-wheel-driven category, and ratified Spirit of Americas time for this mark. This became the official FIA LSR, although Campbell was disappointed not to have beaten Breedlove's time. In October, several four-wheel jet-cars surpassed the 1963 mark, but were eligible for neither FIA nor FIM ratification. The confusion of having three different LSRs lasted until December 11, 1964, when the FIA and FIM met in Paris and agreed to recognize as an absolute LSR the higher speed recorded by either body, by any vehicles running on wheels, whether wheel-driven or not.

See also 
 List of vehicle speed records
 British land speed record
 Production car speed record
 Land speed record for rail vehicles
 Motorcycle land speed record
 Aero-engined car
 Pioneer 2M – Soviet Union attempt at the land speed record in early 1960s
 Budweiser Rocket – Claimed but not verified to have reached  and to have broken the sound barrier in 1979
 Rosco McGlashan – Australia's fastest man on the land. His Aussie Invader team is building a fully rocket-powered LSR car with an attempt at the record currently on hold pending funding.

References

External links 
 
  – Australian challengers to the supersonic showdown
 Speed Record Club – The Speed Record Club seeks to promote an informed and educated enthusiast identity, reporting accurately and impartially to the best of its ability on record-breaking engineering, events, attempts and history.
 The Land Speed Record in the Sixties: an on-line collection

 
 
Record progressions